William Muhlberg (April 8, 1875, Cincinnati, Ohio — April 5, 1962, Cincinnati, Ohio) was an American physician, physiologist, and medical director for the Union Central Life Insurance Company. He was awarded the 1942 Banting Medal of the American Diabetes Association.

Biography
William Muhlberg graduated in 1893 from Cincinnati's Woodward High School and then attended the University of Cincinnati. In 1897 he graduated from the Ohio Medical College, which became part of the Ohio State University College of Medicine. For a year and a half from 1897 to 1898 he was a medical intern at Cincinnati's City Hospital, which became part of the University of Cincinnati Academic Health Center. For the academic year 1897–1898 he studied physiology in Bern, Switzerland. He also did postgraduate work in Vienna and Berlin. For the academic year 1899–1900 he was an assistant in the laboratory of physiology of Harvard Medical School, where he worked with William Townsend Porter. For some time Muhlberg was a pathologist at Cincinnati's Deaconess German Hospital. He was a professor of physiology at Ohio Medical College from 1901 to 1907, when he resigned his professorship.

At Union Central Life Insurance Company, Muhlberg was assistant medical director from 1907 to 1916 and medical director from 1916 until his retirement. On June 7, 1942, in Haddon Hall in Atlantic City, New Jersey, he delivered the Banting Memorial Lecture entitled An Analysis of Statistics Bearing on Diabetes Mellitus.

In 1904 in Idaho Springs, Colorado he married Edna Zinke. Their daughter Edna was born in 1910 in Cincinnati.

Selected publications

References

1875 births
1962 deaths
19th-century American physicians
20th-century American physicians
American physiologists
American diabetologists
American people of German descent
Physicians from Cincinnati
Woodward High School (Cincinnati, Ohio) alumni
Ohio State University College of Medicine alumni
University of Cincinnati faculty